KKOK-FM (95.7 FM), also known as "Prairies Hit Country", is a Country formatted radio station in Morris, Minnesota owned by Iowa City Broadcasting Company, Inc.

It is located at 46671 State Hwy 28, along with sister station KMRS.

External links
KKOK website

Radio stations in Alexandria, Minnesota
Country radio stations in the United States